This is a list of films produced, co-produced and/or distributed by New Line Cinema.

1960s

1970s

1980s

1990s

2000s 
All films released after Semi-Pro are distributed by Warner Bros. Pictures unless otherwise noted.

2010s

2020s

Upcoming films

Notes

References 

Lists of films by studio
American films by studio
Lists of Warner Bros. films